The Balboa Inn is a hotel located on the Balboa Peninsula in the city of Newport Beach, California.

Background
The hotel was established in 1930, and added to the National Register of Historic Places in 1986. The architect was Walter Roland Hagedohm. It is in the Mission/Spanish Colonial Revival styles.

References

External links

Balboa Peninsula
Buildings and structures in Newport Beach, California
Hotels in California
National Register of Historic Places in Orange County, California
Hotel buildings on the National Register of Historic Places in California
Hotels established in 1929
Hotel buildings completed in 1929
Spanish Colonial Revival architecture
Tourist attractions in Orange County, California